Bassendean Oval currently known as Steel Blue Oval for sponsorship reasons, is a sports stadium, located in Bassendean, Western Australia. The capacity of the venue is 22,000 people.

It usually hosts Australian rules football matches and is the home of WAFL and WAWFL Swan Districts Football Club.

The record crowd is 22,350, for a WAFL match between Swan Districts and West Perth in 1980.

The stadium played host to the Big Day Out in 1997, 1998, 1999, 2000, and 2001 and the Soundwave Festival show in March 2009 and 2010.

References

External links

Google Maps aerial image of Steel Blue Oval

West Australian Football League grounds
Sports venues in Perth, Western Australia
Swan Districts Football Club
State Register of Heritage Places in the Town of Bassendean
Bassendean, Western Australia